Earth's orbit is an ellipse with the Earth-Sun barycenter as one focus and a current eccentricity of 0.0167. Since this value is close to zero, the center of the orbit is relatively close to the center of the Sun (relative to the size of the orbit). Earth orbits the Sun at an average distance of 149.60 million km (92.96 million mi) in a counterclockwise direction as viewed from above the Northern Hemisphere. One complete orbit takes  days (1 sidereal year), during which time Earth has traveled 940 million km (584 million mi).

As seen from Earth, the planet's orbital prograde motion makes the Sun appear to move with respect to other stars at a rate of about 1° eastward per solar day (or a Sun or Moon diameter every 12 hours). Earth's orbital speed averages 29.78 km/s (107,208 km/h; 66,616 mph), which is fast enough to cover the planet's diameter in 7 minutes and the distance to the Moon in 4 hours.

From a vantage point above the north pole of either the Sun or Earth, Earth would appear to revolve in a counterclockwise direction around the Sun. From the same vantage point, both the Earth and the Sun would appear to rotate also in a counterclockwise direction about their respective axes.

History of study

Heliocentrism is the scientific model that first placed the Sun at the center of the Solar System and put the planets, including Earth, in its orbit. Historically, heliocentrism is opposed to geocentrism, which placed the Earth at the center. Aristarchus of Samos already proposed a heliocentric model in the third century BC. In the sixteenth century, Nicolaus Copernicus' De revolutionibus presented a full discussion of a heliocentric model of the universe  in much the same way as Ptolemy had presented his geocentric model in the second century. This "Copernican Revolution" resolved the issue of planetary retrograde motion by arguing that such motion was only perceived and apparent. According to historian Jerry Brotton, "Although Copernicus's groundbreaking book ... had been [printed more than] a century earlier, [the Dutch mapmaker] Joan Blaeu was the first mapmaker to incorporate his revolutionary heliocentric theory into a map of the world."

Influence on Earth

Because of Earth's axial tilt (often known as the obliquity of the ecliptic), the inclination of the Sun's trajectory in the sky (as seen by an observer on Earth's surface) varies over the course of the year. For an observer at a northern latitude, when the north pole is tilted toward the Sun the day lasts longer and the Sun appears higher in the sky. This results in warmer average temperatures, as additional solar radiation reaches the surface. When the north pole is tilted away from the Sun, the reverse is true and the weather is generally cooler. North of the Arctic Circle and south of the Antarctic Circle, an extreme case is reached in which there is no daylight at all for part of the year, and continuous daylight during the opposite time of year. This is called polar night and midnight sun, respectively. This variation in the weather (because of the direction of the Earth's axial tilt) results in the seasons.

Events in the orbit

By astronomical convention, the four seasons are determined by the solstices (the two points in the Earth's orbit of the maximum tilt of the Earth's axis, toward the Sun or away from the Sun) and the equinoxes (the two points in the Earth's orbit where the Earth's tilted axis and an imaginary line drawn from the Earth to the Sun are exactly perpendicular to one another). The solstices and equinoxes divide the year up into four approximately equal parts. In the northern hemisphere winter solstice occurs on or about December 21; summer solstice is near June 21; spring equinox is around March 20, and autumnal equinox is about September 23. The effect of the Earth's axial tilt in the southern hemisphere is the opposite of that in the northern hemisphere, thus the seasons of the solstices and equinoxes in the southern hemisphere are the reverse of those in the northern hemisphere (e.g. the northern summer solstice is at the same time as the southern winter solstice).

In modern times, Earth's perihelion occurs around January 3, and the aphelion around July 4. In other words, the Earth is closer to the Sun in January, and further away in July, which might seem counter-intuitive to those residing in the northern hemisphere, where it is colder when the Earth is closest to the sun and warmer when it is furthest away. The changing Earth-Sun distance results in an increase of about 7% in total solar energy reaching the Earth at perihelion relative to aphelion. Since the southern hemisphere is tilted toward the Sun at about the same time that the Earth reaches the closest approach to the Sun, the southern hemisphere receives slightly more energy from the Sun than does the northern over the course of a year. However, this effect is much less significant than the total energy change due to the axial tilt, and most of the excess energy is absorbed by the higher proportion of surface covered by water in the southern hemisphere.

The Hill sphere (gravitational sphere of influence) of the Earth is about 1,500,000 kilometers (0.01 AU) in radius, or approximately four times the average distance to the Moon. This is the maximal distance at which the Earth's gravitational influence is stronger than the more distant Sun and planets. Objects orbiting the Earth must be within this radius, otherwise, they may become unbound by the gravitational perturbation of the Sun.

The following diagram shows the relation between the line of the solstice and the line of apsides of Earth's elliptical orbit. The orbital ellipse goes through each of the six Earth images, which are sequentially the perihelion (periapsis—nearest point to the Sun) on anywhere from January 2 to January 5, the point of March equinox on March 19, 20, or 21, the point of June solstice on June 20, 21, or 22, the aphelion (apoapsis—the farthest point from the Sun) on anywhere from July 3 to July 5, the September equinox on September 22, 23, or 24, and the December solstice on December 21, 22, or 23. The diagram shows a very exaggerated shape of Earth's orbit; the actual orbit is virtually circular.

Context

Future

Mathematicians and astronomers (such as Laplace, Lagrange, Gauss, Poincaré, Kolmogorov, Vladimir Arnold, and Jürgen Moser) have searched for evidence for the stability of the planetary motions, and this quest led to many mathematical developments and several successive "proofs" of stability for the Solar System. By most predictions, Earth's orbit will be relatively stable over long periods.

In 1989, Jacques Laskar's work indicated that Earth's orbit (as well as the orbits of all the inner planets) can become chaotic and that an error as small as 15 meters in measuring the initial position of the Earth today would make it impossible to predict where Earth would be in its orbit in just over 100 million years' time. Modeling the Solar System is a subject covered by the n-body problem.

See also
 Earth phase
 Earth's rotation
 Spaceship Earth

Notes

References

External links

 Earth – Speed through space – about 1 million miles an hour – NASA & (WP discussion)

Orbit
 Dynamics of the Solar System
Geodesy